In tha Beginning... There Was Rap is a compilation album presented by Priority Records, released on November 25, 1997. The album featured cover versions of classic old school hip hop song done by some of hip hop's most popular acts at the time.

The album peaked at No. 15 on the Billboard 200 and No. 4 on the Billboard Top R&B/Hip-Hop Albums chart. Less than two months after its release on January 9, 1998, it was certified gold for sales of 500,000 copies.

Track listing

Charts

Weekly charts

Year-end charts

References

1997 compilation albums
Hip hop compilation albums
Covers albums
Priority Records compilation albums